Gora Alagordy, also known as Besbakan is a mountain in the Dzungarian Alatau range of the Tian Shan mountains systems. It is located on the international border between Kazakhstan and China.

See also
 List of Ultras of Central Asia

References

External links
 
Едем на Бурхан-Булак

Mountains of Xinjiang
Mountains of Kazakhstan
International mountains of Asia
China–Kazakhstan border